Henry A. Patterson was a member of the Wisconsin State Assembly.

Biography
Patterson was born on June 8, 1829 in Lindley, New York. He attended Genesee Wesleyan Seminary. In 1855, Patterson moved to Janesville, Wisconsin. There he formed law partnership with David Noggle and Charles G. Williams. He died on September 26, 1901.

Political career
Patterson was a member of the Wisconsin State Assembly during the 1873 session. He was defeated for re-election by John Winans. Patterson was District Attorney of Rock County, Wisconsin, Postmaster of Janesville, a municipal court judge, and a justice of the peace. He was a Republican.

References

People from Steuben County, New York
Politicians from Janesville, Wisconsin
Members of the Wisconsin State Assembly
District attorneys in Wisconsin
Municipal judges in the United States
American justices of the peace
Genesee Wesleyan Seminary alumni
Wisconsin postmasters
1829 births
1901 deaths
19th-century American politicians
19th-century American judges